Pakistan has a total installed power generation capacity of 43,775 MW as on 30 June 2022. Which includes 26,683 MW thermal, 10,635 MW hydroelectric, 1,838 MW wind, 530 MW solar, 369 MW bagasse and 3,620 MW nuclear.

Thermal

In service
Currently in operation power plants.

Under construction

Nuclear

In service
References:

Hydro

In Service 
References:

Under construction

Wind

In Service 
References:

Under construction 
Reference:

Solar

In service 
References:

Under construction 
References:

Bagasse / biomass

In sevice 
References:

See also 

Electricity in Pakistan
Energy policy of Pakistan
List of power stations in Asia
List of largest power stations in the world
Iran–Pakistan–India gas pipeline

References

Pakistan
 
Power stations